Amar en tiempos revueltos (Spanish for "Love in Troubled Times", or, more literally, "Loving during Turbulent Times"), is a Spanish soap opera set in the times of the Spanish civil war and Francoist Spain. The serial was aired from 2005 to 2012 on La 1 of Televisión Española. Following disagreements of producing company Diagonal TV with RTVE, the fiction was relaunched in January 2013 on Antena 3 as Amar es para siempre. The broadcasting run from 27 September 2005 to 16 November 2012 comprised 1,707 episodes, 8 special episodes and 1 recap episode. The series has won prizes in Spain and a silver medal in the New York Festival.

Seasons

1936–1945 Season 1

Started: 26 September 2005

Ended: 26 June 2006

Episodes: 199

Main love story: Andrea Robles (Ana Turpin) & Antonio Ramírez (Rodolfo Sancho)

Main cast: , Rodolfo Sancho, Pilar Bardem, Luisa Gavasa, Félix Gómez, and Francisco Algora.

1945–1948 Season 2

Started: 11 September 2006

Ended: 3 September 2007

Episodes: 221

Based on the years

Main love story: Elisa Domínguez (Inma Cuesta) & Marcos de la Cruz (Manu Fullola)

Main cast: , Luisa Gavasa, Inma Cuesta, Begoña Maestre, Pastora Vega, Simón Andreu, and Emilio Gutiérrez Caba.

1948–1950 Season 3

Started: 4 September 2007

Ended: 3 September 2008

Episodes: 258 + 2 primes times

Principal love story: Alicia Peña (Sara Casasnovas) & Fernando Solís (Carlos García)

1950–1952 Season 4
 
Started: 4 September 2008

Ended: 27 August 2009

Episodes: 255 + 2 primes times

Principal love story: Ana Rivas (Marina San José) & Teresa García (Carlota Olcina)

1952–1953 Season 5

Started: 28 August 2009

Ended: 3 September 2010

Episodes: 256 + 2 primes times

Principal love story: Ana Rivas (Marina San José) & Teresa García (Carlota Olcina)

1954–1955 Season 6
Started: 6 September 2010

Ended: 2 September 2011

Episodes: 261 + 1 prime time

Protagonist:  Irene Medina (Eva Martín)

1956–1957 Season 7
Started: 5 September 2011

Ended: 15 November 2012

Episodes: 256

Principal love story: Cecilia Armenteros (Natalia Sánchez) & Alberto Cepeda (Gonzalo Ramos)

Cast

Prime-time
FLORES PARA BELLE (Flowers to Belle) – 2008

Episodes: 2

Fernando Solis remembers his first love, Belle, member of the French Resistance, like him, and how she died on a mission turned into a heroine. Flowers to Belle was awarded in February 2009 with the Jury Prize at the XI Festival International du Film de Télévision and Internet at Luchon (France) receiving the Pyrénées d'or for Best Foreign Film.

Characters:

 Ana Turpin – Andrea Robles Castillo
 Manuela Vellés – Belle, Fernando's girlfriend †
 Carlos García – Fernando Solís
 Ángel Hidalgo – Otto Ganz †
 Luisa Gavasa – Loreto Castillo viuda de Robles †
 Itziar Miranda – María Manuela "Manolita" Sanabria Méndez de Gómez
 Manuel Baqueiro – Marcelino "Marce" Gómez Díaz
  – Pelayo Gómez Toledo
 Ana Villa – Soledad "Sole" Gálvez Prieto
 Pablo Viña – Pablo Domínguez Vera
 Ana Otero – Paloma Beltrán viuda de Maturino

¿QUIÉN MATÓ A HIPÓLITO ROLDÁN? (Who killed Hipólito Roldán?) – 2009

Episodes: 2

Hipolito Roldán is found dead in his office. Looks like a suicide, but his psychiatrist, Dr. Julián Maldonado, is obsessed and will not stop until I find out who killed him.

Characters:

 Antonio Valero – Hipólito Roldán †
 Marta Calvó – Regina Caballero Belmez viuda de Roldán
 Sara Casasnovas – Alicia Peña Caballero de Iniesta
 Jesús Cabrero – Álvaro Iniesta Pérez
 Nacho López – Carlos Roldán Caballero
 María Cotiello – Matilde "Mati" Roldán Caballero
 Álex Angulo – Doctor Maeztu
 Itziar Miranda – María Manuela "Manolita" Sanabria Méndez de Gómez
 Manuel Baqueiro – Marcelino "Marce" Gómez Díaz
  – Pelayo Gómez Toledo
 Paloma Tabasco – Enriqueta Muñoz Rodríguez de Gómez
 Ana Villa – Soledad "Sole" Gálvez Prieto de Hernández
 Roberto Mori – Juan Hernández Caminero "Juanito el Grande"
 Pablo Viña – Pablo Domínguez Vera
 Miguel Ángel Muñoz – Doctor Julián Maldonado
 Carmen Morales – Sor Lucía Tudela

ALTA TRAICIÓN (Treason high) – 2010

Episodes: 2

Charles is convicted and executed on charges of treason. Paloma returns to Spain with her son, who kidnap his arrival. It begins like an adventure to find her son, which will be assisted (or treason) of a mysterious British.

Characters:

 Ana Otero – Paloma Beltrán-Carlyle
 Ginés García Millán – Patrick Turner
 Jordi Cadellans – Charles Aloysius Carlyle Laras †
 Joan Masotkleiner – Lord Martin Foster
 Nerea Garmendia – Catherine, nanny of Simón and MI6 spy
 Chema de Miguel – Sir James, attorney Charles
 Kaiet Rodríguez – Simón Carlyle Beltrán
 Itziar Miranda – María Manuela "Manolita" Sanabria Méndez de Gómez
 Manuel Baqueiro – Marcelino "Marce" Gómez Díaz
 Javier Collado – Comisario Héctor Perea Fernández

LA MUERTE A ESCENA (Death scene) – 2011

Episodes: 2

Three mysterious deaths conceal a tangle of economic interests and loves the detectives crossed Hector and Bonilla will have to discover.

Characters:
 Juanjo Puigcorbé – Inspector Domingo Vallejo
 Cayetana Guillén Cuervo – Valle viuda de De la Vega "Estela del Val"
 Javier Collado – Detective Héctor Perea Fernández
 Carlota Olcina – Teresa García Guerrero de Perea
 Marina San José – Ana Rivas Ortiz viuda de García
 Federico Aguado – Detective Inocencio Bonilla
 Beatriz Arguello – Ágata Villa
 María Isasi – Fernanda "Diana" Coronado
 Miguel Mota – Marcos de la Vega †
 Álex Molero – Quintín de las Heras †
 Sebastián Haro – Gabino Cifuentes
 Jordi Díaz – Jacobo Losada
 Adolfo Obregón – Doctor Torres
 Alfonso Vallejo – Honorio Ramos García †
 Pilar Massa – Laura de Vallejo
 Itziar Miranda – María Manuela "Manolita" Sanabria Méndez de Gómez
 Manuel Baqueiro – Marcelino "Marce" Gómez Díaz
  – Pelayo Gómez Toledo
 Nadia de Santiago – María de la Asunción "Asun" Muñoz Ruiz
 Maica Barroso – Felisa Ruiz Sanabria de Muñoz
 Macarena García – Consuelo "Chelo" Muñoz Ruiz
 Sebastián Fernández – Sebastián "Sebas" Ramírez Márquez

References

External links
 Amar en tiempos revueltos Website
 Amar en tiempos revueltos at the Internet Movie Database

Spanish television soap operas
La 1 (Spanish TV channel) network series
Television series set in the 1930s
Television series set in the 1940s
Television series set in the 1950s
2005 Spanish television series debuts
2012 Spanish television series endings
2000s Spanish drama television series
2010s Spanish drama television series
Television series by Diagonal TV